As of 2021, 11 universities in Uganda offer medical schools. Admission to medical school requires the candidate to have attained a Uganda Advanced Certificate of Education (UACE) as well as proficiency in Biology or Zoology, Chemistry and Physics at A-level standards. Training leading to the degree of Bachelor of Medicine and Bachelor of Surgery (MBChB) lasts five years. Major examinations are conducted after the first, second and fifth year, with additional evaluations after each clinical rotation. After successful completion of the fifth year, candidates complete a year of internship under the supervision of specialists. Postgraduate training is available at Makerere University School of Medicine in a number of medical and surgical disciplines. The training takes three years and leads to the Master of Medicine (MMed) degree.

Medical schools
 there are eleven recognized medical schools in Uganda.

Public universities
 Makerere University College of Health Sciences: Mulago, Kampala: Founded in 1924
 Mbarara University School of Medicine: Mbarara: Founded in 1989
 Busitema University School of Medicine: Mbale: Founded in 2013
 Gulu University School of Medicine - Gulu - Founded in 2004
 Kabale University School of Medicine: Kabale: Founded in 2015
 Soroti University School of Medicine: Soroti: Founded  in 2019 (Expected).

Private universities
 Kampala International University School of Health Sciences: Ishaka, Bushenyi: Founded in 2004
 Habib Medical School - Kibuli, Kampala - Founded in 2014
 St. Augustine International University College of Health, Medical & Life Sciences: Mulago, Kampala: Founded in 2012
 Clarke International University School of Medicine: Namuwongo, Kampala: Founded In 2008
 Uganda Martyrs University School of Medicine: Nsambya, Kampala: Founded in 2010
 Uganda Christian University School of Medicine: Mengo, Kampala: Founded in 2018.

Admission
Admission to medical school in Uganda requires the candidate to have attained the pre-requisite minimum score on the A-level national examinations leading to the award of the Uganda Advanced Certificate of Education or UACE, administered by the  Uganda National Examinations Board (UNEB). Proficiency in Biology or Zoology, Chemistry and Physics at A-level standards are requirements for entry into Ugandan medical schools.

Medical training
Training leading to the award of the degree of Bachelor of Medicine and Bachelor of Surgery (MBChB) lasts five (5) years, if there are no re-takes.
 The first year is spent on the Basic Sciences i.e. Anatomy, Physiology and Biochemistry.
 The second year is devoted to Histology, Pathology, Microbiology, Pharmacology, Psychology and Introductory Psychiatry.
 The third year is spent rotating through the four major clinical disciplines of Internal Medicine, Surgery, Pediatrics and Obstetrics and Gynecology.
 The fourth year is devoted to Public Health (including community health projects) and the surgical specialties of Otolaryngology, Orthopedics, Urology, Neurosurgery and Ophthalmology. Clinical Psychiatry, Infectious Diseases and Tropical Medicine are also covered. 
 The fifth year is spent rotating through the four major clinical disciplines, similar to the third year.

Examinations
There is a major examination after the first year. If the candidate does not pass, the candidate will repeat first year. Another major examination is given after second year. A failing candidate will have to repeat second year. After each clinical rotation, the candidate is examined and failing candidates are required to repeat that rotation during the next vacation period.

The last major examination is the final 5th Year MBChB examination. This is divided into three parts:
 A written Examination in each of the following disciplines: Internal Medicine, Surgery, Pediatrics and Obstetrics and Gynecology
 A bedside clinical examination with living patients, involving a "long case" and a series of "short cases" in each of the four specialties.
 An oral examination (also called a "viva"), before two clinical examiners, in each of the four subjects.

The final year clinical examinations in each of the four clinical disciplines are attended by an "External Examiner", often a professor of International or Regional repute, from a foreign medical school. The examiners arrange it so that the excelling students and those who are on the verge of failing are seen by the External Examiner in at least one of the clinical face-to-face encounters. So if you are a candidate and you go before the "External Examiner", it usually means that you are either excelling in your field or you are on the verge of failing that subject.

Internship
After successfully passing the final 5th year examinations, one is awarded the degree of Bachelor of Medicine and Bachelor of Surgery (MBChB). A year of internship in a hospital designated for that purpose, under the supervision of a specialist in that discipline is required before an unrestricted license to practice medicine and surgery is granted by the Uganda Medical and Dental Practitioners Council. Six months of the internship must be spent in a medical discipline (either Internal Medicine or Pediatrics) and another six months in a surgical discipline (either Surgery or Obstetrics and Gynecology).

Internship hospitals
The following hospitals are designated "Internship Hospitals" in Uganda, provided there is a specialist in the required field willing to supervise the intern at the particular hospital:

 Mulago National Referral Hospital
 Arua Regional Referral Hospital
 Fort Portal Regional Referral Hospital
 Gulu Regional Referral Hospital
 Hoima Regional Referral Hospital
 Jinja Regional Referral Hospital
 Kabale Regional Referral Hospital
 Lira Regional Referral Hospital
 Masaka Regional Referral Hospital
 Mbale Regional Referral Hospital
 Mbarara National Referral Hospital
 Mengo Hospital
 Moroto Regional Referral Hospital
 Mubende Regional Referral Hospital
 St. Francis Hospital Nsambya
 Soroti Regional Referral Hospital
 Lubaga Hospital (Formerly Rubaga Hospital)
 St. Mary's Hospital Lacor

Postgraduate training
Specialization training, lasting three years, (provided there are no re-takes), leading to the award of the degree of Master of Medicine (MMed) in the particular discipline is available at Makerere University School of Medicine in the following disciplines: (both medical and surgical disciplines award the MMed)

 Anesthesiology
 Family Medicine
 Hematology
 Internal Medicine
 Medical Oncology
 Microbiology
 Neurosurgery
 Obstetrics and Gynecology
 Ophthalmology
 Otolaryngology
 Pathology
 Pediatrics
 Psychiatry
 Surgery
 Surgical Oncology
 Urology

Makerere University School of Public Health, located on Mulago Hill, offers the degree of Master of Public Health (MPH) following a 22-month period of study which includes field work.

The degree of Doctor of Philosophy (PhD) is awarded following a period of instruction, research and examination (typically three to five years), in select clinical disciplines. A recognized master's degree is required prior to admission into the PhD program.

See also
 List of medical schools in Uganda

References

Medical schools in Uganda
Education in Uganda